The Australian Volleyball League (AVL) is the premier Australian domestic volleyball competition.

Current clubs
The seven clubs of the 2022 season:

Champions
The complete list of the Australian Volleyball League champions:

Men

Women

See also

Volleyball Australia

References

External links

1998 establishments in Australia
Recurring sporting events established in 1998
Sports leagues established in 1998
National volleyball leagues
Sports leagues in Australia
Volleyball competitions in Australia
Professional sports leagues in Australia